The Book Group is a British comedy drama that was broadcast on Channel 4 between 2002 and 2003 and ran for two seasons. It was written and directed by the American-born, Glasgow resident  Annie Griffin, who also wrote and directed Festival. It was the winner of two BAFTA Scotland awards.

In January 2006, it was announced that screenwriter Andrew Davies would make a feature film adaptation of The Book Group for Film 4, but the project was never started.

Plot
The Book Group revolved around the life of American Clare Pettengill (Anne Dudek) who at the start of the series had recently moved from Cincinnati, Ohio to Glasgow, Scotland. She starts a book club to try find friends with similar interests. Those she encounters are not what she expected; a drug-addled, egotistical postgraduate student (and subsequently his neurotic and ever-worrying brother), an easy-going disabled man who aims to be a writer, three discontented footballers' wives, and a straggler who hides his homosexuality with an obsession for football. All of the members are brought together not so much by the books that they read (if they read them at all) but their own longings for companionship, and ambitions to better their lives. Some episodes are titled for the book that is discussed in the group.

Critical reception
Reviewing The Book Group for The Guardian, Gareth McLean stated "the acting is as cracking as the script and the production values" and described the show as "a genuine ensemble drama in which everyone plays a vital part".

Cast
Anne Dudek as Clare Pettengill
Rory McCann as Kenny McLeod
Derek Riddell as Rab
Michelle Gomez as Janice McCann
James Lance as Barney Glendenning/Lachlan Glendenning
Saskia Mulder as Fist de Grooke
Bonnie Engstrom as Dirka Nilssen
Gotti Sigurdarson as Lars Nilssen
Desmond Hamilton as Jackie McCann
Jack McElhone as Wee Jackie McCann
Karen Kilgariff as Jean Pettengill (Series 2)
Kerry McGregor as Carol Ann (Series 2)
Henry Ian Cusick as Miles Longmuir (Series 2)
Ben Miller as Martin (Series 1, 2 episodes)
Andoni Gracia as Anselmo (Series 2, 2 episodes)

Crew
Writer: Annie Griffin 
Director: Annie Griffin
Producers: Anita Overland (series one), Derrin Schlesinger (season two)

Episodes

Season one
"On The Road"
"The Alchemist"
"Magical Realism"
"Bedtime Stories"
"Dark Alley"
"A Little More Living"

Season two
"Sueños"
"Hunger"
"You Must Change Your Life"
"Drowning"
"Research"
"A'salaam Insha'lah"

References

External links

Channel 4 sitcoms
2000s British LGBT-related comedy television series
2002 British television series debuts
2003 British television series endings
2000s British comedy-drama television series
English-language television shows
Television shows set in Glasgow